The Aqueduct of Padre Tembleque, or Tembleque Aqueduct, is a Mexican aqueduct located between the towns of Zempoala, Hidalgo, and Otumba in the State of Mexico.

The structure takes its name from a Spanish friar called Francisco de Tembleque.

Site description 
It passed mostly at ground level, but also went underground as well as over ravines and valleys. There are three arcades along the aqueduct: the first has 46 arches, the second has 13, and the third has 67 arches. The highest valley the aqueduct spans is Papalote ravine, which is crossed by the 67-arch arcade also known as the Main Arcade, with the tallest arch standing .

World Heritage Site status 
This site was added to the UNESCO World Heritage Tentative List on 20 November 2001 in the Cultural category. It was inscribed on the World Heritage Site list on 5 July 2015.

See also 
 Acueducto del Padre Tembleque on the Spanish Wikipedia
 List of World Heritage Sites in Mexico

Notes

References 

 Aqueduct of Padre Tembleque hydraulic system - UNESCO World Heritage Centre Accessed 2019-06-06.
 Kirby, R. S. & F. A. Davis (1990) Engineering in History, Courier Dover Publications. 

Aqueducts in Mexico
Buildings and structures in Hidalgo (state)
Buildings and structures in the State of Mexico
Buildings and structures completed in 1570
1560s in Mexico
1570 establishments in New Spain
World Heritage Sites in Mexico
Spanish Colonial architecture in Mexico